Modern pentathlon competitions at the 2019 Pan American Games in Lima, Peru were held between July 27 and 30, 2019 at the Military School of Chorrillos.

Five medal events were contested. Two were individual events, one per gender. A further three events (men, women and mixed) in the relay format were contested, after the Panamsports added them to the sports program.

The top two athletes from North American and South America, along with the next highest non-qualified athlete qualified for the 2020 Summer Olympics in Tokyo, Japan.

Medal table

Medalists

Qualification

A total of 64 Modern pentathletes qualified to compete. Each nation was allowed to enter a maximum of six athletes (three per gender). Quotas were awarded across three qualification tournaments. The host nation, Peru, automatically qualified four athletes (two per gender).

See also
Modern pentathlon at the 2020 Summer Olympics

References

External links
Results book

 
Events at the 2019 Pan American Games
Pan American Games
2019